Beverly Washburn (born November 25, 1943) is an American actress. She is best known for her roles in the Walt Disney drama Old Yeller (1957) and the American General Pictures horror Spider Baby (1967).

Early years
Washburn was born in Los Angeles, California, on November 25, 1943, the daughter of Mr. and Mrs. Howard Washburn of Hollywood. She is the aunt of actress Darlene Tompkins.

Career 
Washburn began her career as a child actor, when she was 3 years old, appearing in The Killer That Stalked New York (1950) and Frank Capra's Here Comes the Groom (1951). Her subsequent film credits included a supporting role in the Walt Disney feature Old Yeller (1957). By age 16, she had appeared in 10 films and more than 500 television programs.

On television, Washburn portrayed Kathryn "Kit" Wilson, on Professional Father, Shirley Mitchell on Gidget, and Vickie Massey on The New Loretta Young Show. She was also seen regularly on A Letter to Loretta and The Loretta Young Theater.

Washburn is the author of Reel Tears: The Beverly Washburn Story, Take Two, which BearManor Media re-released in 2013.

Filmography

Film

Partial television

References

Sources

External links

1943 births
Living people
American film actresses
Actresses from Los Angeles
American child actresses
21st-century American women